William Darrell "Bubba" Wallace Jr. (born October 8, 1993) is an American professional stock car racing driver. He competes full-time in the NASCAR Cup Series, driving the No. 23 Toyota Camry for 23XI Racing.

Wallace was previously a development driver in Toyota's driver development program where he drove part-time for Joe Gibbs Racing in the Xfinity Series and full-time for Kyle Busch Motorsports in the Camping World Truck Series. He then moved over to Ford and their driver development program and competed full-time for Roush Fenway Racing in the Xfinity Series. After competing in select Cup Series races for Richard Petty Motorsports in their famous No. 43 as an injury replacement for Aric Almirola, Wallace became a full-time driver for RPM in the same car when Almirola left the team, which was his first full-time ride in the Cup Series.

Wallace has been the only full-time African American driver in NASCAR's three national series (Cup, Xfinity, and Truck) each year he has competed in them. He is the only African American driver to win more than once in any of these series, which has made him one of the most successful African American drivers in the history of NASCAR. In addition, in June 2020, Wallace became known for his activism on racial justice in response to the murder of George Floyd and the subsequent Black Lives Matter protests, which led to NASCAR strengthening their actions and efforts in this area, highlighted by them banning the display of the Confederate flag at their tracks.

Racing career

Early career
Wallace started racing in the Bandolero and Legends car racing series, as well as local late model events, at the age of nine. In 2005, he won 35 of the Bandolero Series' 48 races held that year; in 2008 he became the youngest driver to win at Franklin County Speedway in Virginia.

K&N Pro Series/Drive for Diversity

In 2010, Wallace began competing in the NASCAR K&N Pro Series East, a regional and developmental series. Wallace drove for Rev Racing as part of NASCAR's Drive for Diversity program, and was signed as a development driver for Joe Gibbs Racing. He won his very first race in the series, at Greenville-Pickens Speedway, becoming the youngest driver ever to win at the track, he was also the youngest, which began as the Busch North Series in 1987. He also won later in the year at Lee USA Speedway in New Hampshire, on his way to finishing third in series points and winning the series' Rookie of the Year award. He was the first African American to win the Rookie of the Year award in a NASCAR series. Wallace's 2011 season would see him winning three times, at Richmond International Raceway, Columbus Motor Speedway, and Dover International Speedway, and he finished second in points to Max Gresham.

Wallace moved to race directly for Joe Gibbs Racing for the 2012 season. Racing the entire K&N East Series season along with four to six selected races in the Nationwide Series, Wallace won the second East event of the year at Greenville-Pickens Speedway, his first win with JGR.

In 2018, Wallace returned to K&N East at Watkins Glen driving the No. 27 Chevrolet for Jefferson Pitts Racing to provide him with extra road course seat time before the Cup Series race later that weekend.

Xfinity Series

2012
Wallace made his national series debut in the Xfinity Series in late May, driving the No. 20 Dollar General Toyota for JGR at Iowa Speedway; he ran in the top ten for most of the event, finishing 9th. After posting further top ten finishes in his next two starts in the series, Wallace won his first career Nationwide Series pole at Dover International Speedway in late September.

2014
In 2014, he returned to the Nationwide Series for Joe Gibbs Racing in the No. 20, starting in May at Talladega Superspeedway where he would finish 34th after being involved in The Big One while running 13th. He ran only one more Nationwide race that year, at Daytona in July with Coca-Cola's "Share a Coke" campaign sponsoring where he would finish a strong 7th.

2015

Following the 2014 season, it was expected that Wallace would move up to the Xfinity Series with Joe Gibbs Racing in a full-time ride, with the owner Joe Gibbs claiming they would have "a big program" for the young driver. After the team struggled to find sponsorship for more than 15 races, on December 8, 2014, Wallace announced he had been granted his request to leave JGR and seek other opportunities. Later, it was reported he had signed a deal to compete in the Xfinity Series for Roush Fenway Racing for 2015 with Chad Norris as his crew chief. On December 18, 2014, RFR officially announced that they had signed Wallace to compete full-time in the No. 6 Ford Mustang in 2015, with sponsors and crew members to be announced at a later date. On January 28, 2015, at NASCAR Media Day, it was announced that Wallace would drive the No. 6 Ford EcoBoost Mustang. Wallace started the season with a 12th-place finish at Daytona and earned 14 top-tens to finish 7th in the final point standings. He was beaten by Daniel Suárez for Rookie of the Year by a single top-ten finish.

2016

Wallace finished 6th in the season opener at Daytona. He dropped to 11th in points but earned his best career finish at Dover International Speedway finishing 2nd to the dominant Erik Jones and making the inaugural Xfinity Series chase. He made it to the round of 8 before being eliminated after the penultimate race at Phoenix.

2017

After finishing 33rd in the season-opening race at Daytona, Wallace finished in sixth place five consecutive times. However, at Bristol, Wallace struggled. After starting from last, Wallace was trapped a lap down throughout the race, eventually getting caught up in a late crash. Wallace would finish the race in 33rd. At Charlotte, Wallace would run upfront for a majority of the race, even leading for 3 laps, but a late-race pit stop relegated him behind the top ten. Wallace got loose and hit the wall with a few laps to go costing him a top ten and finishing 28th. However, despite being fourth in the Drivers' Championship standings, Roush Fenway announced that they would be suspending operations of Wallace's Xfinity Series team following the Pocono race weekend due to sponsorship issues.

Wallace signed with Biagi-DenBeste Racing to drive the No. 98 Ford at Chicagoland Speedway where he would score a 10th-place finish.

Truck Series

2013

In February 2013, it was announced that Wallace would run a full season in the Camping World Truck Series in the No. 54 Toyota owned by Kyle Busch Motorsports. At Rockingham Speedway in April Wallace, following accidental contact with Ron Hornaday Jr., was turned by Hornaday under a caution flag, his truck hitting the outside wall. Hornaday was penalized for the contact by being sent to the rear of the field; after the race, Hornaday was penalized 25 championship points and assessed a $25,000 fine, in addition to being placed on probation for the remainder of the season. The situation was compared to an incident at the 2011 WinStar World Casino 350K where Kyle Busch deliberately wrecked Hornaday at Texas Motor Speedway.

On October 26, 2013, Wallace became the first African-American driver to win in one of NASCAR's national series since 1963, winning the Camping World Truck Series Kroger 200 at Martinsville Speedway. The only previous win by an African-American driver was by Wendell Scott in the Grand National Division on December 1, 1963. Wallace finished 8th in points in his rookie season.

2014
In 2014, Wallace returned to the Camping World Truck Series full-time in the No. 54. In June, Wallace won the Drivin' for Linemen 200 at Gateway Motorsports Park. Three weeks later, he battled Kyle Larson and Ron Hornaday Jr. for the win at Eldora Speedway. Wallace held off a hard charging Larson, who wrecked his car trying to catch him, and beat Hornaday by a 5.489-second margin to win the second annual Mudsummer Classic. Wallace switched to the No. 34 for the Kroger 200 at Martinsville in tribute to Wendell Scott, and led the most laps en route to his second straight victory in the race. Wallace won his final race with KBM, the season finale at Homestead Miami Speedway, beating Larson again to earn his first non-short track victory. Wallace's four wins along with nine top fives and 14 top tens led to a third-place finish in points.

2017
Wallace returned to the Camping World Truck Series at Michigan in August, driving the No. 99 Truck for MDM Motorsports, and ended up winning the race, holding off Christopher Bell and Kyle Busch who rounded out the top three. However, Wallace's truck was discovered to have had illegal vent holes, resulting in an L1-level penalty that suspended crew chief Shane Huffman for one race and penalized the No. 99 team ten points.

2018
In May, Wallace once again returned to the Truck Series, driving the No. 20 for Young's Motorsports at Kansas. He finished 14th after running out of fuel from 5th with 4 laps to go.

2019

In March, Wallace returned to the Truck Series for the TruNorth Global 250 at Martinsville and Vankor 350 at Texas, driving the No. 22 for AM Racing. He filled in for the team's driver/owner, Austin Wayne Self, following his suspension. Wallace would finish 10th and 20th, respectively, in these two races. Self would then be reinstated before the next race (at Dover) and he returned to his truck.

2021
In March 2021, Wallace joined Spencer Davis Motorsports to drive their No. 11 in the Pinty's Dirt Truck Race on Bristol Motor Speedway's dirt layout. For this race, the truck was fielded in a partnership with Hattori Racing Enterprises. He finished 11th in the race.

Cup Series

2017

On June 5, 2017, Richard Petty Motorsports announced plans to have Wallace drive the team's No. 43 Ford in place of injured Aric Almirola, making Wallace the first African-American to race in the Cup Series since Bill Lester in 2006. In qualifying for his Cup debut at the Pocono 400, he was able to advance to the second round and start 16th. During the race, Wallace suffered from speeding penalties on pit road, including one while he was serving an earlier pass-through penalty; at one point, he nearly missed his pit stall because he looked for his Xfinity pit sign instead of the No. 43. He went on to finish 26th and one lap down. After congratulating Ryan Blaney in Victory Lane, Wallace passed out and required medical attention. He later stated, "This is the third time this is happened. I get so pissed off at myself that I just pass out."

Wallace earned a finish of 11th at Kentucky after being involved in a last-lap wreck.

2018

After Aric Almirola announced his departure from Richard Petty Motorsports, team owner Richard Petty announced in an interview that he and the team were working on hiring Wallace as the new driver of the No. 43 in 2018. Wallace was officially introduced to the team as their new driver on October 25, 2017. He is the first African-American driver to have a full-time Cup ride since Wendell Scott in 1971.

Prior to the season-opening Daytona 500, Wallace received support from National Baseball Hall of Famer Hank Aaron and Formula One driver Lewis Hamilton. He drove the No. 43 Chevrolet Camaro to finish second behind Austin Dillon, the highest finish by a full-time rookie driver in race history, after beating Denny Hamlin to the start/finish line by .002 seconds. Wallace, however, scored only two additional top-10 finishes at the spring Texas race and the fall Phoenix race. He finished  28th place in the final point standings.

In October 2018, Wallace was named in Ebony magazine's Power 100 list, joining the ranks of Stephen Curry, Antonio Brown, Venus Williams and former president and First Lady Barack and Michelle Obama.

2019

Despite continuing to have mediocre finishes in the 2019 season, Wallace displayed his full potential with RPM at the 2019 Monster Energy NASCAR All-Star Race by winning the second stage of the Monster Energy Open and finishing fifth in the All-Star Race. His other highlight of the early-to-mid summer was at Watkins Glen, when he spun Kyle Busch off the track on lap 61.

At the Brickyard 400, Wallace had one of the best runs of his career by finishing third after running top 10 all day long. He continued to show improvements to his finishes during the season, notably at Richmond, where he started 37th and finished 12th.

At the Charlotte Roval, Wallace finished 24th after Alex Bowman spun him out on lap 42 after Wallace gave Bowman the middle finger gesture on several laps. Wallace retaliated after the race by splashing water on Bowman's face. NASCAR Executive Vice President and Chief Racing Development Officer Steve O'Donnell said on Sirius XM NASCAR Radio that officials plan to have a conversation with Wallace about the altercation. On October 5, Wallace apologized to Jeff Gordon, AMR NASCAR Safety medical director Dr. Angela Fiege, and Hendrick Motorsports executive Jeff Andrews for getting them splashed during the incident, but stated that he does not regret what he did to Bowman.

On November 9, Wallace was fined $50,000 and docked 50 points for intentionally manipulating competition at Texas when he spun his car on the track after experiencing a tire failure. He once again finished 28th in the final points standings.

2020

For the 2020 season, Wallace was reunited with crew chief Jerry Baxter, who worked with him in the Truck Series. In the Pennzoil 400 at Las Vegas, Wallace finished sixth for his best finish on a 1.5-mile track. When the season was halted after four races due to the COVID-19 pandemic, he was 18th in points.

During the stoppage, he participated in the NASCAR-sanctioned eNASCAR iRacing Pro Invitational Series, where he made headlines at the sim racing league's Bristol event for quitting early by choice after wrecking on the 11th lap. Wallace responded to fan criticism by mocking how easily they got offended over a video game. In response, his main sponsor Blue-Emu dropped its sponsorship of the virtual No. 43 car. Blue-Emu executive vice president Ben Blessing said that Wallace's outburst would have been unacceptable during a physical race. As Blessing saw it, Wallace's outburst was not the act of a NASCAR driver, but of "someone like my 13-year-old son who broke his controller playing some game where he builds houses." Later in the Pro Invitational season, after initially posting a tweet seeking a spotter for the event at Talladega, Wallace announced that he would "opt-out," stating that practicing for the iRacing events was too difficult: "I simply get burnt out after a day. Not the games fault, just been like that for years."

Wallace scored a second top ten in the Supermarket Heroes 500 at Bristol after starting 36th. Further top tens came in the Brickyard 400 at Indianapolis and FireKeepers Casino 400 at Michigan with ninth-place finishes in both. In the regular season-ending Coke Zero Sugar 400 at Daytona, he recorded a fifth-place finish despite being involved in a late-race wreck.

On September 10, Wallace announced he would leave RPM at the end of the 2020 season. He finished 22nd in the points standings.

2021: 23XI racing and first career win

On September 21, 2020, Michael Jordan announced he and NASCAR veteran Denny Hamlin had created a NASCAR team, named 23XI Racing with Wallace serving as the first driver in the No. 23. Wallace was replaced by Ty Dillon in the 2021 Busch Clash as Wallace was not eligible to compete in the race. After qualifying fourth for the Daytona 500, he finished second in his Bluegreen Vacations Duel to Austin Dillon. He was classified 17th in the Daytona 500 after being involved in a fiery last-lap wreck. Wallace scored a second-place finish at the August Daytona Race. He originally placed third, but due to a post-race car inspection failure on the No. 17 car of Chris Buescher, his result was increased to second, equaling his best ever Cup Series result at the 2018 Daytona 500. On October 4, 2021, Wallace earned his first career Cup win at Talladega after the race was shortened due to rain. Wallace is the first Black driver to win a Cup Series race since Wendell Scott in 1963. Wallace also scored the first win for a McDonald's-sponsored car since Jimmy Spencer in 1994.

2022

Wallace continued with 23XI Racing alongside new teammate Kurt Busch. He raced at the 2022 Daytona 500 with a full McDonald's sponsored paint scheme, finishing runner-up to Austin Cindric by 0.036 seconds. Wallace was in contention late in the race at Atlanta, but would finish 13th after being involved in a wreck on the last lap. On March 29, 2022, crew chief Bootie Barker was suspended for four races due to a tire and wheel loss during the 2022 Texas Grand Prix at COTA. Dave Rogers was announced as Wallace's crew chief for Richmond, Martinsville, Bristol, and Talladega. At Michigan, Wallace won his first career pole and finished second to Kevin Harvick.  Following the final regular season race at Daytona Wallace, in a must-win situation, failed to qualify for the Playoffs.  However, on August 31, 2022, it was announced that Bubba, along with crew chief Barker, would switch rides at 23XI for the remainder of the season, as they move over to the No. 45 car as it seeks the owner's championship. On September 11, Wallace scored his second win at Kansas after leading the final 67 laps and holding off Hamlin. At Las Vegas, Kyle Larson charged aggressively past Kevin Harvick and Wallace, causing Wallace to scrape the outside wall. Wallace retaliated with a right rear hook on Larson, wrecking both cars down the frontstretch and severely damaging Christopher Bell's car in the process. During the caution, Wallace engaged in a shoving match with Larson. Wallace was suspended for one race for the incident; John Hunter Nemechek was assigned to drive the No. 45 at Homestead. He ended the campaign 19th in the drivers' standings.

Noose investigation
On June 21, 2020, a member of Wallace's team reported to NASCAR that a noose had been placed in Wallace's garage stall at Talladega Superspeedway, which NASCAR president Steve Phelps relayed to Wallace in the evening. The organization condemned the act as "heinous" and said they would consult with law enforcement. Wallace stated that he was "incredibly saddened" by the "painful reminder of how much further we have to go as a society and how persistent we must be in the fight against racism", but also praising his fellow drivers that are "driving real change and championing a community that is accepting and welcoming of everyone". Before the GEICO 500 race the next day, the drivers and crews pushed Wallace's car to the front of pit road in a show of solidarity, a gesture that drivers Jimmie Johnson and Kevin Harvick proposed.

A day after the race, an investigation by the FBI concluded that Wallace was not the victim of a hate crime: the alleged noose was a pull-down rope with a loop, in the style of a hangman's knot, that was located on an overhead door, and had been in the garage since the fall Talladega race in 2019. The FBI's determination led to people criticizing Wallace on social media as fake and questioning his integrity. Wallace stated in interviews that although he was relieved that he was not specifically targeted, he was frustrated by the backlash he received. He nonetheless vowed not to let the incident or the subsequent "hoax" allegations "break" him. He added that regardless of "whether [it was] tied in 2019" or "wasn't directed at me ... somebody tied a noose".

On June 25, 2020, NASCAR released a photo of the noose taken by security. In a teleconference later that day, Phelps explained NASCAR had inspected every garage at the sanctioning body's 29 tracks, with 11 garages containing pull-down ropes tied in knots but only Wallace's being tied into a noose. Although the individual responsible was not identified, Phelps announced that NASCAR would require sensitivity and unconscious bias training for its personnel and that "Bubba Wallace and the 43 team had nothing to do with this."

Two weeks after the GEICO 500, on July 6, President Donald Trump tweeted that Wallace should apologize for the investigation, branding it a hoax while adding it and NASCAR's Confederate flag ban "has caused lowest ratings EVER!" Trump's ratings claim was refuted by Fox Sports executive vice president Michael Mulvihill, who said the ratings had increased by eight percent since the 2020 season resumed in May, while Wallace received support from figures like Johnson, driver Tyler Reddick, and basketball player LeBron James.

Activism

Philanthropy
Wallace founded and runs the Live to be Different Foundation. He was also the National Motorsports Press Association's Pocono Spirit Award winner for the second quarter of 2020, and the recipient of the Comcast Community Champion of the Year award for 2020.

Black Lives Matter
In May 2020, after the murder of George Floyd by Derek Chauvin in Minneapolis, Wallace began to speak out about the abuse of African Americans by the police, becoming the face of stock car racing's involvement in the Black Lives Matter movement. On June 8, 2020, he called on NASCAR to prohibit displays of the Confederate battle flag at NASCAR races. In 2015, after the publication of photographs showing the white man who killed nine black churchgoers in Charleston, South Carolina, posing with the flag, the organization began asking fans not to display the flag at its races. However, many fans in the South continued to hoist the Confederate flag at races. On June 10, 2020, NASCAR officially banned the display of the flag at its events.

In the 2020 Blue-Emu Maximum Pain Relief 500 NASCAR race at Martinsville Speedway, Wallace's car had a special paint scheme to honor Black Lives Matter. The car featured an illustration of black and white hands interlocking together on the hood of the car, the hashtag #BlackLivesMatter on the side, and the phrase "Compassion, Love, Understanding" on both the hood and the back bumper. Richard Petty, owner of Richard Petty Motorsports, contributed to the livery by adding a peace symbol on the rear quarter-panel of the car that features hands of all colors circling inside the peace symbol. The livery was made after Richard Petty Motorsports failed to secure a primary sponsorship for the race. The team later suggested the idea to Wallace to run an all-black car to honor the movement. Wallace finished 11th after securing top-ten finishes in both stages, his career-best at Martinsville in the Cup Series.

Personal life
Wallace was born in Mobile, Alabama, and raised in the city of Concord, North Carolina, where he attended Northwest Cabarrus High School.

Born to a black mother and a white father, Wallace is the son of Darrell Wallace Sr. and Desiree Wallace. His father is the owner of an industrial cleaning company, and his mother is a social worker who ran track at the University of Tennessee.

Wallace is best friends with fellow NASCAR Cup Series driver Ryan Blaney. The two first met when they raced Bandoleros in their youth.

In 2019, Wallace revealed that he dealt with and continues to deal with depression for most of his racing career. After others reached out to him to thank him for bringing awareness to depression, Wallace said he did not know it was such a widespread problem; for him, being depressed was an honest answer to a media question.

On July 23, 2019, Wallace posted photos of Richard Petty autographing his left forearm. He vowed to have Petty's signature tattooed if the photos were retweeted 43,000 times. The goal was made by the morning of July 25. Less than a month later, Wallace had Petty's signature tattooed on the back of his right thigh.

Wallace is a Christian. In an interview with Esquire in 2020, Wallace clarified that his criticism of Michael McDowell after an incident at that year's All-Star Race was not meant as an attack on McDowell's Christian faith as some had perceived. "A lot of people took that as attacking his faith and it definitely wasn't that. I have nothing against that. I'm a Christian myself. When you go disrespectful, then that shows the character that you are. That's what I was getting at." Wallace's wrecked front bumper from the incident was put up for auction and raised $20,034 for the Christian non-profit organization Motor Racing Outreach.

In media
In 2017, Wallace voiced the character Bubba Wheelhouse in the 2017 Pixar film Cars 3.

Leading up to the 2018 Daytona 500, he starred in the Facebook Watch series Behind the Wall: Bubba Wallace.

Wallace and 23XI co-owner Denny Hamlin appear in the music video for Post Malone's 2021 song "Motley Crew".

In 2022, he was the subject of the Netflix docu-series Race: Bubba Wallace. The six-episode series follows Wallace's career during the 2020 and 2021 seasons, including his off-track life and activism.

Motorsports career results

Stock car career summary

† As Wallace was a guest driver, he was ineligible for championship points.

NASCAR 
(key) (Bold – Pole position awarded by qualifying time. Italics – Pole position earned by points standings or practice time. * – Most laps led.)

Cup Series

Daytona 500

Xfinity Series

Camping World Truck Series

 Season still in progress 
 Ineligible for series points

K&N Pro Series East

ARCA Racing Series
(key) (Bold – Pole position awarded by qualifying time. Italics – Pole position earned by points standings or practice time. * – Most laps led.)

References

External links

 
 
 

1993 births
Living people
Sportspeople from Mobile, Alabama
Racing drivers from Alabama
People from Concord, North Carolina
NASCAR drivers
African-American racing drivers
ARCA Menards Series drivers
NASCAR controversies
21st-century African-American sportspeople
Kyle Busch Motorsports drivers
RFK Racing drivers
Joe Gibbs Racing drivers